The Mirshikar are a Muslim community, found in North India who were traditionally hunters and trappers of birds and small animals. This title was used for the high position of "chief huntsman" and served in the courts of Persian and Mughal rulers and taught them to hunt.

History and origin

The word Mirshikar is a combination of two Urdu words, mir meaning lord and shikar meaning a hunt, and their name means a leader of a hunting party. They are mostly concentrated in the Indian states of Bihar and Uttar Pradesh. The Mirshikar speak a dialect which is a combination of Urdu and Hindi. Mirshikars in Bihar and Uttarpradesh hunt both by day and night and work alongside other trapper communities like the Bahelia and Mallaha. Most are into animal husbandry. They are emerged from the pashtuns (Pathans) who were came from the poor villages. They started so many different profession over the time for the survival. The main profession was the hunting. They started calling themselves 'MIRSHIKAR' for their own satisfaction in the society as the term 'MIRSHIKAR' means 'Lord of the hunters' until this community was proposed by the government. Mirshikar community, because of their low literacy rate was unable to emerge again as Pashtuns (Pathans) but their title remain the same as Khan, Pakhtan, Alam, or with no title -for Male. On the other hand, Nisha, Khatoon, Khatun, Aara, Parween are used as the title for the Female till now Beside this, there is a Massive number of Mirshikar Muslim having the title 'KHAN' referring to this title as their predecessor's title and claimed that they are often known as the 'LATHMAAR PATHAN' and a pure orthodox Muslim. 'LATHMAAR PATHAN' is referred to the pathan groups which are very talented in order fight with Laathi (Bamboo stick). Nowadays Mirshikar are making a growth  in the literacy rate in which reservation for the MIRSHIKAR Muslim is playing a major role for their upliftment. In some parts of Uttar Pradesh the tribe name is reduced to maskar.

Practices 
In one Mirshikar community in Bihar, young men needed to prove themselves fit for marriage by catching a loha sarang, the black-necked stork known for being vicious. The practice was stopped when a boy was killed in the process.

Ali Hussain from a mirshikar community in Manjhaul in Begusarai is acclaimed for his work as a bird trapper for the Bombay Natural History Society. He worked with Salim Ali and many other ornithologists to aid the marking and study of birds. In 1998 he was flown to Jackson County, Mississippi and during his 1-week visit, he demonstrated his clap-trap and noose-trap techniques and helped capture 10% of the sandhill crane population of Mississippi. His method is now a standard in crane research. In 1998, the Indian government Films Division recorded a documentary featuring Ali Hussain.

Present circumstances

The Mirshikar are scattered are across Bihar and Uttar Pradesh. They are an endogamous community, marrying close kin. The majority are landless agricultural labourers. There has also been a steady emigration of the Mirshikar to other  states of India, where many are now found. A few are also involved in the manufacture of bamboos flute. Just like other Muslim community in India they are also an extremely marginalized community, with a poor literacy rates. The Mirshikar are Sunni Muslims, and are fairly orthodox.

See also
Bahelia

References

Dalit Muslim
Dom in India
Social groups of Bihar
Indian castes
Muslim communities of India
Muslim communities of Bihar
Dom people
Romani in India